Beishenshu station is a subway station on Line 17 of the Beijing Subway. The station opened on December 31, 2021.

Platform Layout
The station has an underground island platform.

The artwork "Tree of Wisdom" is arranged on the station hall floor of this station. This group of works was created by Tang Jun, Jiao Le, Que Zhenxi, and Tuo Chenxi. The combination of elements implies the orderly development of biotechnology and creates a sense of space technology. Each hexagon uses movable annual rings, biological fingerprints, and ripples to describe the endless life and nature.

Exits
There are 4 exits, lettered A, B, C and D. Exits B and D are accessible via elevators.

References

Beijing Subway stations in Tongzhou District
Railway stations in China opened in 2021